Reidar Berg (March 30, 1924 – February 16, 2018) was a Norwegian bobsledder who competed in the late 1940s. At the 1948 Winter Olympics in St. Moritz, he finished 15th in the four-man event. He was born in Oslo.

References
1948 bobsleigh four-man results
Reidar Berg's profile at Sports Reference.com
Reidar Berg's obituary

Olympic bobsledders of Norway
Bobsledders at the 1948 Winter Olympics
Norwegian male bobsledders
Sportspeople from Oslo
1924 births
2018 deaths